Roksanda Ilinčić is a Serbian fashion designer based in London, England. She owns a fashion brand named Roksanda (stylized in all caps), which she introduced in 2005 at London Fashion Week.

Personal life
Roksanda Ilinčić was born in Belgrade, capital of Serbia, and travelled extensively with her parents; her father Lazar was a businessman and her mother Ranka worked in public relations.

Ilinčić lives in north London with her husband and their daughter.

Career
Ilinčić studied architecture and design at the Faculty of Applied Arts, University of Arts in Belgrade, before coming to study at Central Saint Martins in London in 1999, where she earned her master's degree in Womenswear.

She has been showing her collections on the London Fashion Week schedule since 2005, later adding swimwear and blossom, a childrenswear line, to the ready-to-wear offering.

The first Roksanda store – a collaboration with architect David Adjaye – opened in June 2014 at 9 Mount Street in London's Mayfair.

In 2016, Ilinčić has won British Designer of the Year at Elle Style Awards. In November 2014, she was named Business Woman of the Year at the Harper's Bazaar UK Women of the Year Awards. The year, before Ilinčić won the Red Carpet Designer award at the British Elle Style Awards, and in 2012, the Red Carpet Award at the British Fashion Awards.

Roksanda designs are currently on display at the Women, Fashion, Power exhibit at the Design Museum; they have also been featured in the Victoria & Albert Museum's exhibition Ballgowns: British Glamour since 1950.

Notable clients
The brand has been worn by Catherine, Princess of Wales, Michelle Obama, Samantha Cameron, Cate Blanchett, Emily Blunt, Kristen Stewart, Amy Adams, Keira Knightley, and Melania Trump.

Awards
In 2018, Ilinčić received the Knight of the St. Sava Order of Diplomatic Pacifism award from the Serbian Minister of Foreign Affairs Ivica Dačić.

References

External links
 Official website

Fashion designers from Belgrade
High fashion brands
British brands
English fashion designers
British women fashion designers
University of Belgrade alumni
Living people
Serbian expatriates in England
Alumni of Central Saint Martins
Knights of the St. Sava Order of Diplomatic Pacifism
1975 births